Wapsipinicon State Park is located south of Anamosa, Iowa, United States.  The  park is along the sandstone and limestone bluffs of the Wapsipinicon River, from which it derives its name.  It is one of the oldest state parks in Iowa, and it was listed as a historic district on the National Register of Historic Places in 2014.

Description
The initial  for the park was donated by a local citizens group that raised around $23,000  in 1921 to buy the land in order to preserve it and to keep the timber from being logged.  The park was dedicated in 1923, making Wapsipinicon one of the first state parks established in Iowa.  The park has several archaeological sites where evidence of Pre-Columbian era societies lived.  Two historic bridges that cross the river are also part of the park's historic nature. The Hale Bridge, which was moved here in 2006, is a rare surviving example of a bowstring through-truss.

The facilities in the park were developed in the 1920s and the 1930s utilizing the Rustic style of architecture.  Unlike many state parks in Iowa from this era that had their facilities built by the Civilian Conservation Corps, a public work relief program during the Great Depression, Wapsipinicon's facilities were constructed by prisoners from nearby Anamosa State Penitentiary.  They built the shelters, stone arch bridges and the roads. The limestone for the structures was quarried locally, and it took about five years to complete the construction.  In the years following the inmates continued to maintain the park.

The park's recreational activities include camping, fishing and boating.  Trails are provided for hiking, cross country skiing and snowmobiling.  There are also a couple of caves to explore, including an ice cave.  The park is a terminus for the Northeast State Park Bike Route, which connects it to Pikes Peak State Park and Backbone State Park by way of county highways.  Hunting is allowed in season in an adjacent  that was acquired in 1990.  A nine-hole golf course in the park is maintained by the Wapsipinicon Country Club.

References

Protected areas established in 1923
Native American history of Iowa
State parks of Iowa
Rustic architecture in Iowa
Protected areas of Jones County, Iowa
Buildings and structures in Jones County, Iowa
National Register of Historic Places in Jones County, Iowa
Parks on the National Register of Historic Places in Iowa
Archaeological sites on the National Register of Historic Places in Iowa
Historic districts on the National Register of Historic Places in Iowa
Historic districts in Jones County, Iowa
1923 establishments in Iowa